The 1932 Westminster Abbey by-election was a parliamentary by-election held on 12 July 1932 for the British House of Commons constituency of Westminster Abbey in London. The seat had become vacant when the Conservative Member of Parliament (MP) Otho Nicholson resigned from the Commons by becoming the Steward of the Manor of Northstead on 4 July 1932. He had held the seat since a 1924 by-election. The Conservative candidate, Sidney Herbert, previously MP for Scarborough and Whitby, was returned unopposed and remained the seat's MP until his death in 1939 when a further by-election was held.

Result

References
 
 British Parliamentary Election Results 1918-1949, compiled and edited by F.W.S. Craig (The Macmillan Press 1979)

1932 elections in the United Kingdom
By-elections to the Parliament of the United Kingdom in London constituencies
Elections in the City of Westminster
Unopposed by-elections to the Parliament of the United Kingdom (need citation)
1932 in London
1930s in the City of Westminster